WKID (95.9 FM "Froggy 95.9") is a radio station owned by Dial Broadcasting in Vevay, Indiana.  The station operates with 3,000 watts radiated power.  Studios are located on Main Street in Vevay.

External links
Station Web Site
Froggy Online Stream

KID
Switzerland County, Indiana
Country radio stations in the United States
Radio stations established in 1974
1974 establishments in Indiana